Rafael Moya Murillo  (October 24, 1799 – November 15, 1864) was a Costa Rican politician and businessman. He was the son of José Moya y Saborido and Micaela Murillo y Rojas. He worked as a farmer and became one of the largest coffee growers in the province of Heredia. He also took an interest in mining and trade. In 1844 he was elected to the Costa Rican Senate. As the oldest senator he was temporarily  put in charge of the country's head of State on November 29, 1844 and held that position until April 30, 1845.

He got votes in the presidential election of 1847 and a considerable number of electors supported his presidential candidacy in the election of 1849, which was won by Juan Rafael Mora Porras.

He died in Heredia, Costa Rica, on November 15, 1864.

Costa Rican politicians
1799 births
1894 deaths
Costa Rican liberals